North Point Camp was a Japanese World War II Prisoner-of-war camp in North Point, Hong Kong which primarily held Canadian and Royal Naval prisoners.

History

Built by the Hong Kong government as a refugee camp before the war, it was severely damaged during the Japanese invasion of Hong Kong Island on the night of December 18, 1941. It began life as a POW camp almost immediately after, as non-Chinese civilians from the area were interned there, as were the first men of West Brigade who were captured in the battles at the beachheads, Jardine's Lookout, and Wong Nai Chung Gap. After a few months, the Royal Naval prisoners were moved to Sham Shui Po POW Camp and North Point became purely Canadian. The Canadians themselves moved out to Sham Shui Po on September 26, 1942, at which point the camp was closed. Conditions at camp were overcrowded and unsanitary. The two main threats that the prisoners faced were disease and the lack of food, which proved fatal for many interned at the camp.

Today part of the old camp site is the King's Road Playground, but there are no memorials of any kind.

See also
Tin Chiu Street
Japanese occupation of Hong Kong
List of Japanese-run internment camps during World War II
Second Sino-Japanese War
Stanley Internment Camp

References

Further reading

External links
 Hong Kong War Diary: The POWs
 North Point Refugee / POW camp, on Gwulo website
 Picture of the camp

Japanese occupation of Hong Kong
North Point
Japanese prisoner of war and internment camps